is a Japanese electronic music composer, best known for his work in the Ape Escape video game series. He started producing music in 1989 as well as remixing singers such as Nami Shimada. He and fellow producer Shinichiro Yokota formed Far East Recording in 1990, releasing various albums and singles. In 1999, after releasing Sumo Jungle, he was given an opportunity to compose for Ape Escape.

In 2014, "The Far East Transcripts" EP was released, sparking interest in Terada's work. A year after, the album Sounds from the Far East was released, which led to him touring and creating more music.

Biography

Early life and career 
Terada was born on March 19, 1965, in Tokyo, Japan, playing the electronic organ when he was younger. He majored in computer science and electronic organ at the University of Electro-Communications. In 1987, he traveled to New York City as a part of a three-piece band and "fell in love with the city and its distinctive sound." When he returned to Tokyo, he started producing house music and trying to emulate the city's style, sending demos to labels like Sleeping Bag Records but with no avail. That same year, Terada met Shinichiro Yokota at a Vestax DJ Contest, where Terada introduced Yokota to house music synthesizers and letting him use his instruments.

In 1989, he produced the song "Sun Shower" for singer Nami Shimada, which was remixed by Larry Levan and Mark Kamins. A year after, he and Yokota formed the label Far East Recording after Terada graduated university, releasing their first album called Far East Recording in 1992.

In 1997, he composed for the Japanese drama Psychometrer Eiji alongside Chuei Yoshikawa and DJ Krush.

Video games and Omodaka 

Terada started composing soundtracks for video games in 1998, with his first for Wangan Trial.

In 1999, Terada was given an opportunity to compose the music for Ape Escape after a game director listened to his track "Sumo Jungle." When he learned what the game was about, Terada was "really excited" as he played on the PlayStation and was shown demo footage of the game. A year after, he composed for the Japanese version of the PlayStation 2 game Fantavision.

In 2001, he created the project Omodaka while trying to create a "boat racing song." He released the first album, Cantata No. 147, under the project in 2006. Japanese folk singer Akiko Kanazawa joined the project as the genre transitioned to folktronica in 2009. That same year, he donned a white mask and a Miko outfit. Under the project, Terada writes about the prostitution during the Edo period and gambling in Japan and starts with a backing tracks first instead of lyrics.

Resurgence 
In 2014, London-based Japanese label Hhatri released The Far East Transcripts, an EP which included three of Yokota's tracks and one of Terada's tracks. The EP sparked renewed interest in Japanese house music, especially Yokota and Terada's works. In 2015, Dutch label Rush Hour reached out to Terada if he wanted to release a compilation album of his work, to which he agreed. They released a compilation album called Sounds from the Far East, which was compiled by German-born Korean DJ Hunee.

The album's release led to Terada producing more music and going on tours, including Europe and North America for the first time in 2016. In 2017, he toured with Nick Dwyer of Weird Together in India, which was hosted by the Red Bull Music Academy.

Artistry

Influences 
Terada is influenced by house and hip hop, as well as bands such as RC Succession, Akiko Yano and Yellow Magic Orchestra. He has since moved away from hip-hop to more sample-based and digital production. He is also influenced by foreign people, such as English singer Sheila Chandra.

Musical style 
Terada's musical style focuses on house music and jungle.
In an interview with Vice, he revealed that he uses the stereotypes of Asia when running the Far East Label, with Terada also saying the he is happy when someone tells him that he combines "Asian elements" with house music.

As Omodaka, he is influenced by YMCK, traditional Japanese music, and retro game sounds. He uses consoles such as the Game Boy, Nintendo DS, PSP, and Korg Kaossilator.

Discography

Albums

As Soichi Terada

As Omodaka

As Far East Recording

Games

References

1965 births
Japanese composers
Japanese electronic musicians
Japanese house musicians
Japanese male composers
Japanese music arrangers
Living people
Musicians from Tokyo
Remixers
Video game composers